Mike Rivera may refer to:
 Mike Rivera (baseball) (born 1976), Major League Baseball catcher
 Mike Rivera (American football) (born 1986), American football linebacker